Sincoraea heleniceae is a species of flowering plant in the family Bromeliaceae, native to Brazil (the state of Bahia). It was first described in 2004 as Orthophytum heleniceae.

References

Bromelioideae
Flora of Brazil
Plants described in 2004